Wayne Yearwood (born September 22, 1964) is a Canadian former professional and Olympic basketball player, who was with the Canadian national team. Born in Montreal, Quebec, he played for Team Canada at the 1988 Summer Olympics in Seoul, South Korea, along with his friend and teammate Dwight Walton, and played seven years with the Canadian national team along with Steve Nash for several years, and eight years playing professionally in Europe. Yearwood played college basketball at Dawson College, with friends and teammates Dwight Walton and Trevor C. Williams. In the United States, he played NCAA Division I college basketball at West Virginia University. He played two years in Greek Basket League with the colors of Panathinaikos and Apollon Patras. End of the '90 he played in Switzerland for Vevey Basket and Genève Versoix Basket. Yearwood also played football as a wide receiver for West Virginia and was selected by the Calgary Stampeders of the Canadian Football League in the 2nd round of the 1988 CFL Draft. 

In 1992, Yearwood was sentenced to 15 months in prison for selling cocaine while at West Virginia.

Yearwood is currently the head basketball coach for the men's AAA team at Dawson College in Montreal.

References

External links 
Frozen Hoops: Canadian Basketball History of NBA basketball in Canada. Selection of Top 100 Canadian players of all time
basketpedya.com

1964 births
Living people
Anglophone Quebec people
Apollon Patras B.C. players
Basketball players at the 1988 Summer Olympics
Black Canadian basketball players
Canadian men's basketball coaches
Canadian men's basketball players
Canadian expatriate basketball people in the United States
Canadian expatriate basketball people in Greece
Canadian expatriate basketball people in Switzerland
Dawson College alumni
Dawson College coaches
Olympic basketball players of Canada
Panathinaikos B.C. players
BBC Monthey players
Vevey Riviera Basket players
Basketball players from Montreal
West Virginia Mountaineers men's basketball players
West Virginia Mountaineers football players
Canadian players of American football
Gridiron football people from Quebec
American football wide receivers
Canadian drug traffickers
Sportspeople convicted of crimes
Canadian people imprisoned abroad
Canadian players of Canadian football